The 1955–56 Liga Gimel season saw 72 clubs competing in 10 regional divisions for promotion to Liga Bet. This was the first season of fourth tier football in Israel, following the formation of Liga Leumit as the top division.

Hapoel Saded, Hapoel Kfar Ata, Hapoel Tiberias, Hapoel Zikhron Ya'akov, Hapoel Givat Haim, Hapoel Lod, Hapoel Holon, Hapoel Jaffa, Hapoel Ramla and Hapoel Be'er Sheva won their regional divisions and qualified for the Promotion play-offs.

At the Promotion play-offs, Hapoel Kfar Ata and Hapoel Tiberias were promoted to Liga Bet from the North play-offs, whilst Hapoel Ramla and Hapoel Be'er Sheva were promoted to Liga Bet from the South play-offs.

Upper Galilee Division

Hapoel She'ar Yashuv and Maccabi Safed withdrew from the league during the season.

Western Galilee Division

Jordan Valley Division

North Division

Maccabi Afula withdrew from the league during the season.

Samaria Division

Sharon Division

Dan Division

Beitar Ramat Israel withdrew from the league during the season.
Hapoel Jaffa defeated Maccabi Bat Yam in a deciding match to qualify to the promotion play-offs.

Middle Division

Central Division

South Division

See also
1955–56 Liga Leumit
1955–56 Liga Alef
1955–56 Liga Bet

References
Football (Page 19) M. Almog, Hapoel 1956, 1956, www.infocenters.co.il (Hapoel Archive) 

Liga Gimel seasons
4